Gonehalli is a small village in Kumta taluka. Its neighboring villages are Torke, Devarbhavi and Bankikodla.

Notable people
 Bala Saheb
 Gati Saheb
 N. H. Gouda

See also 
 Karwar
 Ankola
 Mangalore
 Kumta

References
 - Gonehalli village

Villages in Uttara Kannada district